The Katsura-bon (桂本) is the oldest extant copy of the Man'yōshū. It was produced around the middle of the Heian period, and is named for having formerly been in the possession of the Katsura-no-miya family.

Overview 
The Katsura-bon is the oldest surviving Man'yōshū manuscript, having been copied around the middle of the Heian period. It is named for its having formerly been in the possession of the Katsura-no-miya house.

It consists of 175 poems and an index of another 37. These are written on a single scroll containing 109 poems from Book IV, or roughly 1/3 of the book, along with another fragment (occasionally called the Toganoo-gire 栂尾切) containing 66 poems along with an index of 37 more.

It is written on beautiful coloured paper decorated with images of flowers, birds, grass and trees. It is said to show hardly any influence of jiten readings, and to preserve the vestiges of the koten readings.

The stylized seal imprinted on the reverse indicates that it was in the holdings of Emperor Fushimi. The scroll was held by Maeda Matsu, the wife of Maeda Toshiie, and in the time of Maeda Toshitsune entered the holdings of the Katsura-no-miya household. In 1881, with the extinction of the Katsura-no-miya house, it passed into the possession of imperial household.

Notes

References

Citations

Works cited 

 
 

Man'yōshū